The Titanium Awards is an annual award show honoring video games at the Fun & Serious Game Festival. The first awards were held in 2011, honoring the year's contributions to the video game industry. The awards conclude the festival.

Fun & Serious Game Festival 
Fun & Serious Game Festival is a video game festival that takes place, in Bilbao, Spain, from late November to the beginning of December since its foundation in 2011. Its main objective is to recognize the cultural importance of video games. To do so, several leisure and training activities are celebrated, such as the VIT Talks and the Fun & Serious Awards.

The Fun & Serious Game Festival has the support of the Basque Regional Government - SPRI, the city hall of Bilbao and Vizcaya's Porvincial Council. Besides, it is sponsored by the newspaper 'El Correo'. Among the strategic partners of this event relevant brands from the sector can be found, such as Microsoft, PlayStation and Ubisoft. The Spanish Association of video games (AEVI) also collaborates with the Festival.

The Titanium Award changed its name and design in 2015, in reference to the titanium, a metal that represents the transition experimented in the city of Bilbao. In 2016, the total number of assistants was of 25000 people.

In 2018, by its eighth edition, the festival changed its location, moving to the Bilbao Exhibition Centre of Baracaldo, in order to increase the habitual capacity. In 2019 the IX edition will take place, between the 6th and 9 December, where Yōko Shimomura will be awarded with the Titanium award for her input in the video games' music world. Furthermore, the compositor will impart a talk in the VIT Talks of this festival.

Ceremonies

Award winners

2011 
The first ceremony for the Titanium Awards was celebrated at the Campos Eliseos Theater on November 8, 2011, and it was presented by Patricia Conde and Alex Odogherty.

2012

2013

2014

2015

2016 
The ceremony took place at the Guggenheim Museum of Bilbao and was presented by the actress Itziar Atienza and the journalist Toni Garrido. The awards were handed by Ed Vaizey, the basketball player  Alex Mumbrú and the comedian Hovik Keuchkerian.

2017 
The ceremony was held in the Guggenheim Museum of Bilbao and was presented by the journalist Iñaki López and the actress Itziar Atienza.

2018

2019

References

External links 
 

Video game awards